GTP-binding protein ARD-1 is a protein that in humans is encoded by the TRIM23 gene.

Function 

The protein encoded by this gene is a member of the tripartite motif (TRIM) family. The TRIM motif includes three zinc-binding domains, a RING, a B-box type 1 and a B-box type 2, and a coiled-coil region. This protein is also a member of the ADP ribosylation factor family of guanine nucleotide-binding family of proteins. Its carboxy terminus contains an ADP-ribosylation factor domain and a guanine nucleotide binding site, while the amino terminus contains a GTPase activating protein domain which acts on the guanine nucleotide binding site. The protein localizes to lysosomes and the Golgi apparatus. It plays a role in the formation of intracellular transport vesicles, their movement from one compartment to another, and phospholipase D activation. Three alternatively spliced transcript variants for this gene have been described.

Interactions 

TRIM23 has been shown to interact with TRIM31, TRIM29 and PSCD1.

References

Further reading